There are several 2014 UCI World Championships. The International Cycling Union (UCI) holds World Championships every year. In 2014, they include:

 2014 UCI Road World Championships
 2014 UCI Track Cycling World Championships
 
 
 2014 UCI Mountain Bike & Trials World Championships
 
 2014 UCI Cyclo-cross World Championships
 2014 UCI BMX World Championships
 

UCI World Championships
UCI World Championships